The 2015–16 Brooklyn Nets season was the 40th season of the franchise in the National Basketball Association (NBA), and its fourth season playing in the New York City borough of Brooklyn.

In the off-season, the Nets let Deron Williams go after five seasons with the team. He later signed with the Dallas Mavericks.

On February 25, the Nets parted ways with All-Star Joe Johnson. Two days later, Johnson signed with the Miami Heat.

The Nets finished with a 21–61 record, their worst since moving to Brooklyn in 2012.

Key dates
January 10: the Nets fire head coach Lionel Hollins after starting the season with a 10–27 record. Tony Brown is named interim head coach.
January 10: Billy King resigns as the general manager for the Nets.
February 18: Sean Marks hired as the general manager of the Brooklyn Nets.

Draft picks

Roster

Game log

Preseason game log

|- style="background:#fbb;"
| 1 
| October 5
| Fenerbahçe
| 96–101
| Brook Lopez (18)
| Thomas Robinson (16)
| Shane Larkin (5)
| Barclaycard Center6,857
| 0–1
|- style="background:#bfb;"
| 2 
| October 8
| @ Detroit
| 93–83
| Larkin, Lopez (17)
| Brook Lopez (9)
| Donald Sloan (7)
| The Palace of Auburn Hills10,019
| 1–1
|- style="background:#fbb;"
| 3 
| October 10
| @ Philadelphia
| 95–97
| Jarrett Jack (20)
| Thaddeus Young (10)
| Justin Harper (3)
| Wells Fargo Center6,737
| 1–2
|- style="background:#fbb;"
| 4 
| October 14
| Boston
| 105–109
| Thaddeus Young (19)
| Thomas Robinson (12)
| Ryan Boatright (6)
| Barclays Center10,482
| 1–3
|- style="background:#bfb;"
| 5 
| October 18
| Philadelphia
| 92–91
| Brook Lopez (24)
| Thaddeus Young (10)
| Joe Johnson (6)
| Barclays Center10,756
| 2–3
|- style="background:#fbb;"
| 6 
| October 19
| @ Boston
| 105–111
| Bojan Bogdanovic (18)
| Thomas Robinson (9)
| Donald Sloan (6)
| TD Garden15,540
| 2–4

Regular season game log

|- style="background:#fbb;"
| 1
| October 28
| Chicago
| 
| Brook Lopez (26)
| Joe Johnson (10)
| Shane Larkin (8)
| Barclays Center17,732
| 0–1
|-style="background:#fbb;"
| 2
| October 30
| @ San Antonio
|  
| Brook Lopez (17)
| Thaddeus Young (7)
| Jarrett Jack (7)
| AT&T Center18,418
| 0–2
|-style="background:#fbb;"
| 3
| October 31
| @ Memphis
| 
| Bojan Bogdanovic (19)
| Brook Lopez (10)
| Jarrett Jack (9)
| FedExForum16,013
| 0–3

|-style="background:#fbb;"
| 4
| November 2
| Milwaukee
| 
| Brook Lopez (18)
| Brook Lopez (9)
| Joe Johnson (6)
| Barclays Center12,576
| 0–4
|- style="background:#fbb;"
| 5
| November 4 
| @ Atlanta
| 
| Brook Lopez (27)
| Brook Lopez (11)
| Joe Johnson (6)
| Philips Arena14,044
| 0–5
|- style="background:#fbb;"
| 6
| November 6
| L.A. Lakers
| 
| Brook Lopez (23)
| Rondae Hollis-Jefferson (11)
| Jarrett Jack (12)
| Barclays Center17,732
| 0–6
|- style="background:#fbb;"
| 7
| November 7
| @ Milwaukee
| 
| Brook Lopez (20)
| Thaddeus Young (13)
| Joe Johnson (6)
| BMO Harris Bradley Center15,228
| 0–7
|- style="background:#bfb;"
| 8
| November 11
| @ Houston
| 
| Bojan Bogdanović (22)
| Brook Lopez (12)
| Joe Johnson (10)
| Toyota Center18,155
| 1–7
|- style="background:#fbb;"
| 9
| November 13
| @ Sacramento
| 
| Jarrett Jack (21)
| Brook Lopez (10)
| Jarrett Jack (12)
| Sleep Train Arena17,131
| 1–8
|- style="background:#fbb;"
| 10
| November 14
| @ Golden State
| 
| Jarrett Jack (28)
| Rondae Hollis-Jefferson (13)
| Jarrett Jack (9)
| Oracle Arena19,596
| 1–9
|- style="background:#bfb;"
| 11
| November 17
| Atlanta
| 
| Brook Lopez (24)
| Thaddeus Young (11)
| Joe Johnson (9)
| Barclays Center12,241
| 2–9
|- style="background:#fbb;"
| 12
| November 18
| @ Charlotte
| 
| Thaddeus Young (27)
| Jack, Young (8)
| Jarrett Jack (9)
| Barclays Center12,241
| 2–10
|- style="background:#fbb;"
| 13
| November 20
| @ Boston
| 
| Lopez, Young (14)
| Rondae Hollis-Jefferson (11)
| Jarrett Jack (5)
| TD Garden18,361
| 2–11
|- style="background:#bfb;"
| 14
| November 22
| Boston
| 
| Brook Lopez (23)
| Thaddeus Young (12)
| Shane Larkin (5)
| Barclays Center14,866
| 3–11
|- style="background:#fbb;"
| 15
| November 25
| @ Oklahoma City
| 
| Brook Lopez (26)
| Rondae Hollis-Jefferson (11)
| Shane Larkin (6)
| Chesapeake Energy Arena18,203
| 3–12
|- style="background:#fbb;"
| 16
| November 28
| @ Cleveland
| 
| Brook Lopez (22)
| Thaddeus Young (12)
| Jarrett Jack (14)
| Quicken Loans Arena20,562
| 3–13
|- style="background:#bfb;"
| 17
| November 29
| Detroit
| 
| Thaddeus Young (19)
| Thaddeus Young (10)
| Brook Lopez (5)
| Barclays Center12,823
| 4–13
|-style="background:#fbb;"

|- style="background:#bfb;"
| 18
| December 1
| Phoenix
| 
| Brook Lopez (23)
| Rondae Hollis-Jefferson (9)
| Jack, Larkin (8)
| Barclays Center12,787
| 5–13
|- style="background:#fbb;"
| 19
| December 4
| @ New York
| 
| Brook Lopez (21)
| Thaddeus Young (11)
| Joe Johnson (4)
| Madison Square Garden19,812
| 5–14
|- style="background:#fbb;"
| 20
| December 6
| Golden State
| 
| Thaddeus Young (25)
| Thaddeus Young (14)
| Shane Larkin (6)
| Barclays Center17,732
| 5–15
|- style="background:#bfb;"
| 21
| December 8
| Houston
| 
| Brook Lopez (24)
| Thaddeus Young (12)
| Jarrett Jack (9)
| Barclays Center13,319
| 6–15
|- style="background:#bfb;"
| 22
| December 10
| Philadelphia
| 
| Andrea Bargnani (23)
| Thaddeus Young (11)
| Jarrett Jack (8)
| Barclays Center13,266
| 7–15
|- style="background:#fbb;"
| 23
| December 12
| L. A. Clippers
|  
| Thaddeus Young (18)
| Brook Lopez (12)
| Jarrett Jack (11)
| Barclays Center15,689
| 7–16
|- style="background:#fbb;"
| 24
| December 14
| Orlando
| 
| Jarrett Jack (15)
| Thaddeus Young (11)
| Jarrett Jack (7)
| Barclays Center12,946
| 7-17
|- style="background:#fbb;"
| 25
| December 16
| Miami
| 
| Brook Lopez (25)
| Thaddeus Young (7)
| Jarrett Jack (10)
| Barclays Center15,113
| 7–18
|- style="background:#fbb;"
| 26
| December 18
| @ Indiana
| 
| Jarrett Jack (26)
| Thaddeus Young (14)
| Jarrett Jack (6)
| Bankers Life Fieldhouse16,548
| 7–19
|- style="background:#fbb;"
| 27
| December 20
| Minnesota
| 
| Brook Lopez (20)
| Brook Lopez (12)
| Jack, Johnson (6)
| Barclays Center14,552
| 7–20
|- style="background:#bfb;"
| 28
| December 21
| @ Chicago
| 
| Brook Lopez (21)
| Thaddeus Young (13)
| Jarrett Jack (8) 
| United Center21,825
| 8–20
|- style="background:#fbb;"
| 29
| December 23
| Dallas
| 
| Thaddeus Young (29)
| Thaddeus Young (10)
| Jarrett Jack (8)
| Barclays Center15,994
| 8–21
|- style="background:#fbb;"
| 30
| December 26
| Washington
| 
| Brook Lopez (19)
| Thaddeus Young (14)
| Jarrett Jack (11)
| Barclays Center17,732
| 8–22
|- style="background:#bfb;"
| 31
| December 28
| @ Miami
| 
| Brook Lopez (26)
| Brook Lopez (12)
| Shane Larkin (7)
| American Airlines Arena19,975
| 9–22
|- style="background:#fbb;"
| 32
| December 30
| @ Orlando
| 
| Brook Lopez (24)
| Brook Lopez (15)
| Jarrett Jack (10)
| Amway Center18,397
| 9–23

|- style="background:#bfb;"
| 33
| January 2
| @ Boston
| 
| Brook Lopez (30)
| Brook Lopez (13)
| Jarrett Jack (9)
| TD Garden18,624
| 10–23
|- style="background:#fbb;"
| 34
| January 4
| Boston
| 
| Thaddeus Young (23)
| Thaddeus Young (15)
| Joe Johnson (4)
| Barclays Center15,448
| 10–24
|- style="background:#fbb;"
| 35
| January 6
| Toronto
| 
| Brook Lopez (24)
| Brook Lopez (13) 
| Shane Larkin (4)
| Barclays Center14,544
| 10–25
|- style="background:#fbb;"
| 36
| January 8
| Orlando
| 
| Brook Lopez (17)
| Thaddeus Young (9)
| Donald Sloan (5)
| Barclays Center13,907
| 10–26
|- style="background:#fbb;"
| 37
| January 9
| @ Detroit
| 
| Brook Lopez (19)
| Thaddeus Young (9)
| Donald Sloan (10) 
| Palace of Auburn Hills16,406
| 10–27
|- style="background:#fbb;"
| 38
| January 11
| San Antonio
| 
| Brook Lopez (18)
| Thaddeus Young (9)
| Donald Sloan (5) 
| Barclays Center15,214
| 10–28
|- style="background:#bfb;"
| 39
| January 13
| New York
| 
| Brook Lopez (20)
| Thaddeus Young (11)
| Joe Johnson (6) 
| Barclays Center15,214
| 11–28
|- style="background:#fbb;"
| 40
| January 15
| Portland
| 
| Brook Lopez (25)
| Thomas Robinson (10)
| Donald Sloan (10) 
| Barclays Center14,749
| 11–29
|-style="background:#fbb;"
| 41
| January 16
| @ Atlanta
| 
| Thaddeus Young (18)
| Thaddeus Young (11)
| Donald Sloan (12) 
| Philips Arena17,052
| 11–30
|-style="background:#fbb;"
| 42
| January 18
| @ Toronto
| 
| Brook Lopez (29)
| Brook Lopez (10)
| Joe Johnson (7) 
| Air Canada Centre19,800
| 11–31
|- style="background:#fbb;"
| 43
| January 20
| Cleveland
| 
| Brook Lopez (16)
| Brook Lopez (10)
| Donald Sloan (9)
| Barclays Center17,732
| 11–32
|- style="background:#fbb;"
| 44
| January 22
| Utah
| 
| Bojan Bogdanovic (14)
| Joe Johnson (5) 
| Donald Sloan (6)
| Barclays Center12,809
| 11–33
|- style="background:#bfb;"
| 45
| January 24
| Oklahoma City
| 
| Brook Lopez (31)
| Thaddeus Young (14)
| Joe Johnson (6) 
| Barclays Center16,019
| 12–33
|- style="background:#fbb;"
| 46
| January 26
| Miami
| 
| Andrea Bargnani (20)
| Brook Lopez (10)
| Joe Johnson (8)
| Barclays Center15,267
| 12–34
|- style="background:#fbb;"
| 47
| January 29
| @ Dallas
| 
| Brook Lopez (28)
| Brook Lopez (12)
| Johnson, Sloan (4)
| American Airlines Center20,409
| 12–35
|- style="background:#fbb;"
| 48
| January 30
| @ New Orleans
| 
| Brook Lopez (33)
| Brook Lopez (10)
| Shane Larkin (6)
| Smoothie King Center18,037
| 12–36

|- style="background:#fbb;"
| 49
| February 1
| Detroit
| 
| Brook Lopez (27)
| Shane Larkin (6)
| Shane Larkin (14)
| Barclays Center13,290
| 12–37
|- style="background:#fbb;"
| 50
| February 3
| Indiana
| 
| Brook Lopez (21)
| Thaddeus Young (14)
| Joe Johnson (9) 
| Barclays Center13,311
| 12–38
|- style="background:#bfb;"
| 51
| February 5
| Sacramento
| 
| Joe Johnson (27)
| Thaddeus Young (14)
| Joe Johnson (11)
| Barclays Center14,432
| 13–38
|- style="background:#fbb;"
| 52
| February 6
| @ Philadelphia
| 
| Thaddeus Young (22)
| Thaddeus Young (10)
| Donald Sloan (4)
| Wells Fargo Center18,847
| 13–39
|- style="background:#bfb;"
| 53
| February 8
| Denver
| 
| Thaddeus Young (20)
| Thomas Robinson (11)
| Joe Johnson (8)
| Barclays Center13,043
| 14–39
|- style="background:#fbb;"
| 54
| February 10
| Memphis
| 
| Brook Lopez (20)
| Robinson, Young (9)
| Donald Sloan (8)
| Barclays Center14,262
| 14–40
|- align="center"
| colspan="9" style="background:#bbcaff;" | All-Star Break
|- style="background:#bfb;"
| 55
| February 19
| New York
| 
| Brook Lopez (33)
| Donald Sloan (10)
| Joe Johnson (6)
| Barclays Center17,732
| 15–40
|-style="background:#fbb;"
| 56
| February 21
| Charlotte
| 
| Joe Johnson (17)
| Brook Lopez (10)
| Brook Lopez (6)
| Barclays Center16,155
| 15–41
|- style="background:#fbb;"
| 57
| February 23
| @ Portland
| 
| Brook Lopez (36)
| Thaddeus Young (11)
| Bogdanovic, Johnson, Sloan (4)
| Moda Center19,393
| 15–42
|- style="background:#bfb;"
| 58
| February 25
| @ Phoenix
| 
| Bojan Bogdanovic (24)
| Donald Sloan (9)
| Donald Sloan (6)
| Talking Stick Resort Arena16,145
| 16–42
|- style="background:#bfb;"
| 59
| February 27
| @ Utah
| 
| Thaddeus Young (21)
| Thaddeus Young (8)
| Donald Sloan (6)
| Vivint Smart Home Arena18,863
| 17–42
|- style="background:#fbb;"
| 60
| February 29
| @ L. A. Clippers
|  
| Brook Lopez (25)
| Thaddeus Young (11) 
| Shane Larkin (6)
| Staples Center19,060
| 17–43

|- style="background:#fbb;"
| 61
| March 1
| @ L. A. Lakers
| 
| Brook Lopez (23)
| Thaddeus Young (15)
| Donald Sloan (6)
| Staples Center18,997
| 17–44
|- style="background:#bfb;"
| 62
| March 4
| @ Denver
| 
| Markel Brown (21)
| Markel Brown (8)
| Shane Larkin (8)
| Pepsi Center14,163
| 18–44
|- style="background:#fbb;"
| 63
| March 5
| @ Minnesota
| 
| Markel Brown (23)
| Thomas Robinson (17)
| Larkin, Robinson (5)
| Target Center15,987
| 18–45
|- style="background:#fbb;"
| 64
| March 8
| @ Toronto
| 
| Brook Lopez (35)
| Bogdanovic, Lopez, Robinson (5)
| Donald Sloan (5)
| Air Canada Centre19,800
| 18–46
|- style="background:#fbb;"
| 65
| March 11
| @ Philadelphia
| 
| Brook Lopez (24)
| Thaddeus Young (9)
| Donald Sloan (9) 
| Wells Fargo Center14,128
| 18–47
|- style="background:#fbb;"
| 66
| March 13
| Milwaukee
| 
| Brook Lopez (20)
| Thaddeus Young (10) 
| Bojan Bogdanovic (7)
| Barclays Center15,241
| 18–48
|- style="background:#bfb;"
| 67
| March 15
| Philadelphia
| 
| Bojan Bogdanovic (44)
| Thaddeus Young (16)
| Lopez, Young (4)
| Barclays Center14,560
| 19–48
|- style="background:#fbb;"
| 68
| March 17
| @ Chicago
| 
| Bojan Bogdanovic (26)
| Thaddeus Young (14)
| Bogdanovic, Karasev (5)
| United Center21,513
| 19–49
|- style="background:#fbb;"
| 69
| March 19
| @ Detroit
| 
| Thaddeus Young (24)
| Thaddeus Young (9)
| Donald Sloan (9) 
| The Palace of Auburn Hills17,559
| 19–50
|- style="background:#fbb;"
| 70
| March 22
| Charlotte
| 
| Brook Lopez (29)
| Brook Lopez (9)
| Lopez, Sloan (6)
| Barclays Center15,739
| 19–51
|- style="background:#bfb;"
| 71
| March 24
| Cleveland
| 
| Brook Lopez (22)
| Jefferson, Lopez (7)
| Shane Larkin (7)
| Barclays Center17,732
| 20–51
|- style="background:#bfb;"
| 72
| March 26
| Indiana
| 
| Brook Lopez (23)
| Brook Lopez (9) 
| Donald Sloan (5)
| Barclays Center16,625
| 21–51
|-style="background:#fbb;"
| 73
| March 28
| @ Miami
| 
| Brook Lopez (26)
| Thaddeus Young (9)
| Shane Larkin (8)
| American Airlines Arena20,003
| 21–52
|-style="background:#fbb;"
| 74
| March 29
| @ Orlando
| 
| Thomas Robinson (18)
| Thomas Robinson (12)
| Markel Brown (5)
| American Airlines Arena17,536
| 21–53
|- style="background:#fbb;"
| 75
| March 31
| @ Cleveland
| 
| Thaddeus Young (18)
| Thomas Robinson (11)
| Shane Larkin (8)
| Quicken Loans Arena20,562
| 21–54

|- style="background:#fbb;"
| 76
| April 1
| @ New York
| 
| Sean Kilpatrick (17)
| Thomas Robinson (13)
| Shane Larkin (5)
| Madison Square Garden19,812
| 21–55
|-style="background:#fbb;"
| 77
| April 3
|New Orleans
| 
| Sean Kilpatrick (15)
| Thomas Robinson (15)
| Shane Larkin (9)
| Barclays Center16,329
| 21–56
|-style="background:#fbb;"
| 78
| April 6
| @ Washington
| 
| Thomas Robinson (23)
| Thomas Robinson (10)
| Shane Larkin (8)
| Verizon Center16,846
| 21–57
|-style="background:#fbb;"
| 79
| April 8
| @ Charlotte
| 
| Wayne Ellington (21)
| Thomas Robinson (17)
| Shane Larkin (8)
| Time Warner Cable Arena18,337
| 21–58
|-style="background:#fbb;"
| 80
| April 10
| @ Indiana
| 
| Sean Kilpatrick (26)
| Markel Brown (12)
| Shane Larkin (9)
| Bankers Life Fieldhouse18,165
| 21–59
|-style="background:#fbb;"
| 81
| April 11
| Washington
| 
| Bojan Bogdanovic (20)
| Henry Sims (8)
| Shane Larkin (7)
| Barclays Center14,653
| 21–60
|-style="background:#fbb;"
| 82
| April 13
| Toronto
| 
| Bojan Bogdanovic (29)
| Henry Sims (7)
| Donald Sloan (10)
| Barclays Center16,517
| 21–61

Transactions

Re-signed

Additions

Subtractions

References

Brooklyn Nets season
Brooklyn Nets seasons
Brooklyn Nets
Brooklyn Nets
2010s in Brooklyn
Events in Brooklyn, New York
Prospect Heights, Brooklyn